The Oriana Cinema was an art deco cinema and theatre built in 1938 in Fremantle, Western Australia and demolished in the early 1970s.

History
In 1937 a local company, Hoyts (Fremantle) Pty Ltd (formed by local businessmen and Hoyts Theatres Limited), proposed to construct a picture theatre at the corner of High Street and Queen Street, Fremantle. The cinema was estimated to cost £20,000 and seat 1,300 persons. The site was previously occupied by the Rose and Crown Hotel which was built in 1830 although in the late 1870s it was used as a school, a private dwelling and lodging rooms. The architects were H. Vivian Taylor and Soilleux of Melbourne, who designed the Windsor Theatre in Windsor, the Padua Theatre in Brunswick and the Plaza Theatre in Perth. The cinema, Hoyts Fremantle, was officially opened by the acting Mayor of Fremantle, Cr Stevens on Thursday 4 August 1938. The first film shown at the cinema was Walt Disney Productions', Snow White and the Seven Dwarves and Love on a Budget, starring Shirley Temple.

The cinema, due to the acutely angled intersection on which the site was situated upon, created a visually striking design. The entrance foyer, lounge and stairways were unusual in their spherical design. The cinema featured a "floating" screen, a soundproof "crying room", to allow parents with crying babies to watch the movies and a "powder bar" in the women's lounge. It was also unique in that it used ducted ventilation rather than air conditioning.

The cinema remained under the management of Hoyts (Fremantle) Pty Ltd until the 1961 when it was bought by a consortium of stakeholders including Goldfields Pictures and City Theatres (owned by TVW). This was when it was given the name Oriana Cinema. In 1967 the cinema was renovated reducing the seating capacity to approximately 1,000 and in May 1968 a new  screen was installed. The last screening at the cinema occurred on 4 December 1971.

The demolition was a speedy affair brought about by plans to widen High Street, and despite protest by community groups was effected within four weeks, in March 1972. The building built in its place is set back from the road considerably, with respect to its neighbour the Victoria Hall, as the road-widening plans never did come to fruition.

Following the demolition of the cinema, a series of menswear shops (1972: Walsh's Mens Wear; June 1979: Geoffrey Bruce Men's Clothier) filled the new building, which as of 2012 houses La Tropicana Café, Magpie Books, Raine and Horne Real Estate Agency, Potters House Christian church, and ITP Tax Agents.

References

External links 
 Perspective drawing of proposed picture theatre (1937) 
 1969 picture of exterior of Oriana Cinema
 Images held by the National Library of Australia

Buildings and structures in Fremantle
Cinemas in Perth, Western Australia
Former cinemas
Art Deco architecture in Western Australia
High Street, Fremantle
Former buildings and structures in Perth, Western Australia
Demolished buildings and structures in Western Australia
Buildings and structures demolished in 1972